Summerland (2016 population 11,615) is a town on the west side of Okanagan Lake in the interior of British Columbia, Canada. The district is between Peachland to the north and Penticton to the south. The district is famous for "Bottleneck drive", a system of roads connecting various wineries.

Electoral representatives
The current Mayor is Doug Holmes. The district's (2016 federal) Member of Parliament is Dan Albas of the Conservative Party of Canada. Its member of the Legislative Assembly of British Columbia is British Columbia Liberal Party member, Dan Ashton.

History
In 2006, the District of Summerland celebrated its centennial as an incorporated municipality in 1906, yet the history of settlement in the Summerland area extends beyond that time. Summerland's first inhabitants were the Syilx (Okanagan Salish), with the First Nations boundaries extending from Kamloops to southern Washington state. The area known as "Nicola Prairie" was notably named after the Grand Chief Nicola.

A published map of the Okanagan Valley in 1827 includes only three sites for the entire Okanagan Valley; Nicola Prairie; Lone Tree (north end of Summerland); and Sandy Cove (across the lake from present day Kelowna). Summerland's proud and diverse past includes hunting and fur trading, ranching, orchards and fruit industries, transportation hubs and more recently, tourism. Immigration to the Summerland area commenced in the late 1880s when the first settlers arrived and began diverting water to irrigate orchards. The first commercial orchard was planted in the 1890s in Trout Creek, where a water license was issued to irrigate .

The first settlement identified on maps of the Okanagan Valley was Priest Encampment located on the shores of Garnett Lake. Later development began on the shores of Okanagan Lake. The upper benches continued to be an important transportation route and a number of small communities were constructed or were planned for development. They included Upper Trout Creek, Balcomo, the Prairie Valley Townsite, Mineola and Appledale. In 1892 Upper Trout Creek was established.

Summerland's former name was Trout Creek. In the 1890s George Barclay operated the largest cattle ranch in Trout Creek. In 1902, Sir Thomas Shaughnessy bought the Barclay Ranch and formed Summerland; incorporation was not completed until 1906. By the 1920s the present location of downtown Summerland was developed and the earlier areas on the upper benches were not utilized or forgotten. Downtown Summerland (Siwash Flat) was originally part of the Penticton Indian Reserve No. 3 (exchanged between 1904–06 following a mutually agreeable land deal). The subject lands eventually became known as West Summerland.

Present day Lower Town was the original town site of Summerland. In the early 1900s the Summerland Development Company with Sir Thomas Shaughnessy (President) and J.M. Robinson (Manager) primarily responsible for the initial decisions on its development. From the Company, the community received water, septic tanks, electricity, a post office, a school and a sawmill. Settlers from across the prairies, eastern Canada and England were drawn to the Summerland area.

By 1907, Summerland had access to Peachland and Penticton with a well-established road system, and a ferry service connecting the community with the eastern shore of Okanagan Lake (Naramata). West Summerland (present day Downtown Summerland) experienced increased importance also in part due to a 1922 fire which destroyed many of the lakeside buildings in Lower Town.

Demographics

Ethnicity

Religion 
According to the 2021 census, religious groups in Summerland included:
Irreligion (6,680 persons or 57.1%)
Christianity (4,760 persons or 40.7%)
Sikhism (125 persons or 1.1%)
Buddhism (40 persons or 0.3%)
Hinduism (40 persons or 0.3%)
Judaism (10 persons or 0.1%)
Other (50 persons or 0.4%)

Education
Summerland's public school system is operated by School District 67 Okanagan Skaha which operates two elementary schools (Giants Head and Trout Creek), one middle school (Summerland Middle), and one secondary school Summerland Secondary School. Summerland has two private schools (a Montessori school) and Unisus, a day and full-time boarding school with students from the local Okanagan area and from countries around the world.

Tourism
Summerland is popular because of its situation on Okanagan Lake and sandy beaches, a destination for three major Canadian population centres (Vancouver, Calgary, Edmonton). Both tourism and tourist attractions are a significant industry. Agriculture, featuring fresh tree fruits (peaches, cherries, apricots, apples and pears), and canneries, were the economic engine of the region until the late 20th century. Stone fruit and apples are now produced mainly for the fresh market (local and export).  Over the past 20 years, Summerland has become home to several world-renowned wineries, and despite being in a semi-arid climate, has several golf courses. Summerland is also home to the historic Kettle Valley Steam Railway. The railway takes tourists on a trip around the Dale Meadows region of Summerland and further, eventually ending at the famous Trout Creek Trestle. Tourism Summerland guides visitors to Summerland attractions and events.

Wine
Summerland is home to one of Canada's largest wine industries. Many of Summerland's wineries are connected by the famed 'Bottleneck Drive.' Famed wineries include Giant Head, Thornhaven, Dirty Laundry, Sleeping Giant, SummerGate, Sumac Ridge, Heaven's Gate, SilkScarf, 8th Generation and Estate Thurn.

Sport

Summerland is the home of the Summerland Steam of the Kootenay International Junior Hockey League. The town also used to be the home of the Summerland Sting (2001–2009), and the Summerland Warriors (1999–2000), both of whom played in the same league. Previously the Summerland Buckaroos played in the British Columbia Hockey League from 1983–1988. Summerland is also home to the Summerland Minor Hockey Association (SMHA) known as the Summerland Jets.

Geography
Summerland is located within the Thompson-Okanagan Plateau ecoregion. This is one of the warmest and driest ecoregions in Canada. It is characterized by rolling plateaus and major valley systems of the Okanagan, Thompson and Nicola Rivers. In the summer of 2003, a severe drought nearly rendered the town's reservoir incapable of ensuring a water supply through to the beginning of the next annual replenishment cycle. Since then, awareness of the real need for water conservation measures has begun to be taken seriously, and permanent water use restrictions are now in place.

The immediate ecosystem consists of grasslands in a matrix of bluebunch wheatgrass and sagebrush amongst scattered ponderosa pines. The region has a gently rolling surface covered mainly by glacial deposits. Summerland is home to an extinct volcano, known locally as Giant's Head Mountain – so-named for its gigantic facial profile as viewed from the southeast. This hill dominates the town's land features and provides an hour's hike to the top for an expansive view up and down the Okanagan Valley.

The range of representative wildlife around Summerland includes mule deer, Canada geese, California quail, ravens, coyotes, red wolves (half coyote, half wolf), blue grouse, bald eagles, and black widow spiders. The hills surrounding Summerland is the natural habitat for black bear, white-tailed deer, moose, cougars and bobcats, California big-horn sheep, mountain goats, and rattlesnakes.

Climate
Summerland has a humid continental climate with hot, dry summers and cool winters. Late fall and most of the winter see very little sunshine in Summerland, but Summerland gets more days with sunshine during the spring than any other place in Canada. The sun makes an appearance on average of 88.4 days each spring.

Because Summerland is located up on a natural bench, it stays relatively warm at night. By comparison, Penticton experiences colder nights as the cool air sinks down into the valley below. These warm nights in a dry climate means that Summerland has the lowest morning relative humidity in Canada from May through September.

International relations 
Summerland serves as a sister city with Omak, Washington, a city in the United States, and Toyokoro, Hokkaido, a town in Japan.

Notable people
George Ryga – playwright and novelist
Nicole Dunsdon – Miss Canada 1992
Cynthia Kereluk – Miss Canada 1984
Justin Kripps – Bobsleigh
Kristi Richards – Freestyle skier
Dan O'Rourke – National Hockey League (NHL) referee

Notes

References

External links

District municipalities in British Columbia
Populated places in the South Okanagan
Populated places on Okanagan Lake
Populated places in the Okanagan Country